Germicide, also known as Germicide: Live at the Whisky, 1977, is a live album by the punk rock band the Germs. Performing live at the Whisky a Go Go in 1977, Darby Crash and the Germs were at the beginning of their career. At this time, Crash performed using the name Bobby Pyn. Darby and the audience feud constantly throughout the show. Disc jockey Rodney Bingenheimer appears at the beginning as master of ceremonies, and the band's former drummer Dottie Danger (Belinda Carlisle) briefly takes the mic to introduce the band, who she describes as "sluts".

Track listing
 Forming
 Sex Boy
 Victim
 Street Dreams
 Let's Pretend
 Get a Grip
 Suicide Machine
 Sugar, Sugar
 Teenage Clone (Wild Baby)
 Grand Old Flag

Personnel
 Bobby Pyn (Jan Paul Beahm,  Darby Crash) – vocals
 Pat Smear (Georg Ruthenberg) – guitars
 Lorna Doom (Teresa Ryan, a.k.a. Terry Target) – bass
 Donna Rhia (Becky Barton) – drums

References 

Germs (band) live albums
1981 live albums
Albums recorded at the Whisky a Go Go
Bomp! Records live albums